The Crow: Original Motion Picture Score contains original music written by Graeme Revell for the film The Crow. It was released in 1994. It should not be confused with the soundtrack album, The Crow, which showcases the film's music by popular artists.

The score consists of mostly orchestral music, with some electronic and guitar elements, like the noteworthy song "Inferno" featured in the iconic scene where the title character performs a guitar solo on a rooftop on Devil's Night.

Track listing

References

1994 soundtrack albums
The Crow
Graeme Revell soundtracks
Superhero film soundtracks